Lymington is a rural residential locality in the local government area of Huon Valley in the South-east region of Tasmania. The 2016 census has a population of 283 for the state suburb of Lymington.

History
Lymington was gazetted as a locality in 1971. Previously known as Copper Alley Bay, the locality is believed to be named after a borough called Lymington in Hampshire, England, a seaport and yachting centre.

Geography
The shore of the Huon River estuary forms the south-western boundary and Port Cygnet the south-eastern and eastern.

Road infrastructure
The C639 route (Lymington Road / Cygnet Coast Road) enters from the north-east and runs generally south and west along the shore to the south-west, where it exits. Route C646 (Forsters Rivulet Road) starts from an intersection with C639 and runs generally north-west until it exits.

References

Localities of Huon Valley Council
Towns in Tasmania